Fast Life is a collaborative studio album by rappers Young Noble of Outlawz & Deuce Deuce of Concrete Mob. It was released on February 5, 2013 on Concrete Enterprises. They released a second collaborative album The Code in 2016.

Track listing

References

External links 
 OutlawzMedia.net Official Website
 
 
 
 
 
 
 

2013 albums
Young Noble albums
Collaborative albums